St. Raymond High School for Boys is an American parochial high school, located in the Parkchester section of the Bronx, New York.

Affiliated with the Catholic schools of the Roman Catholic Archdiocese of New York, it is accredited by the Board of Regents of the University of the State of New York, the Middle States Association of Colleges and Schools, and the Brothers of the Christian Schools. 

The school is a recipient of a Blue Ribbon School of Excellence Award (1994–1996), and holds memberships with the National Catholic Educational Association and the Catholic Administrators Association of New York State.  

The school's mascot is the Raven.

Notable alumni 
 Darryl Bryant – professional basketball player
 Mark Gjonaj – member of the New York City Council
 Julius Hodge –  professional basketball player
 Brian Lang – professional basketball player
 Allan Ray –  professional basketball player
 Kareem Reid – professional basketball player
 Terrence Rencher – professional basketball player

Notes and references

External links
 St. Raymond High School Official Site

Roman Catholic high schools in the Bronx
Lasallian schools in the United States
Educational institutions established in 1960
Boys' schools in New York City
1960 establishments in New York City
Parkchester, Bronx